World Fish Migration Day (WFMD) is celebrated every other year to raise global attention to the need for restored river connections for migrating fish to achieve healthier fish stocks and more productive rivers. The 4th and last World Fish Migration Day took place on 24 October 2020. The next one will take place on 22 May 2022.

History
The concept of a day to celebrate fish migration was shown to be a success within the North Sea Region on May 14, 2011. In 2011, partners of the Living North Sea Project, funded by the European Union, participated to raise awareness about fish passage issues in the North Sea Region, including 25 locations in seven countries. The day created publicity in both regional and national press, including social media, magazines, radio and TV stations (From Sea to Source). After the success in 2011, a Dutch conservationist Herman Wanningen from the World Fish Migration Foundation, reached out to various organizations worldwide, including The Nature Conservancy, WWF, and the Freshwater Fish Specialist Group of the International Union for Conservation of Nature (FFSG-IUCN) to create a global celebratory day, which is today known as the World Fish Migration Day. In 2014 the first ever WFMD took place and is now generally planned for every second year in May, under the coordination of the World Fish Migration Platform.

Celebrity endorsements  
On the occasion of World Fish Migration Day May 24, 2014, Sharon Dijksma, the State Secretary of Economic Affairs in The Netherlands sent out message endorsing the WFMD.

Zeb Hogan from Nation Geographics' Monster Fish television program, sent out a message during the 5th annual Fish Passage conference in June 2015, encouraging people to take part in this event. Other celebrities who have encouraged World Fish Migration Day Celebrations include:
 Melanie Schultz van Haegen, 
 Giulio Boccaletti, Global Managing Director for Water at The Nature Conservancy
 Johan van de Gronden, CEO WWF Netherlands
 Richard Sneider, ICUN Global Chair
 Jeremy Wade, host of the TV series River Monsters

Description 
WFMD is a one-day event to create worldwide awareness of the importance of freshwater migratory fish and open rivers for the general public, especially students and their teachers, resource managers and engineers, and commercial and recreational anglers, as well as those individuals who influence public policy that affect rivers. It is a global initiative with activities organized to reach these audiences.

Around the world, coordination and promotion is done through  local activities supported and coordinated by a central office of the World Fish Migration Platform. The website is being developed and ambassadors are arising for national and continental satellite offices. At the individual event level, organizations undertake the development of an activity to raise awareness and involve local people and media about fish migration and open rivers. Local events include a range of activities: field trips, events at a school or aquaria, the opening of a fishways, races, food festivals, etc. At this local level, the logo and central message of the WFMD, connecting fish, rivers and people, is used to connect sites around the world. The day starts in New Zealand and will follows the sun around the world, ending in Hawaii.

WFMD 2014 
May 24, 2014, marked the first ever World Fish Migration Day (WFMD), a worldwide celebration of healthy rivers and free-running fish with over 270 events. On this day, over a 1000 different organisations contributed to WFMD2014, through support and/or participation, in 53 countries worldwide. It was estimated that over 50,000 people participated in events around the world. The events ranged from fun-filled river clean-ups in Poland to successful conferences in Spain, as well as, marches in Ethiopia, open days for viewing bypass channels and releasing fish in the UK and Paraguay. There was a large amount of publicity that was created through social media, TV stations such as BBC, National Geographic magazines and articles, local and regional press and radio shows.

WFMD 2016
WFMD 2016 was held on May 21, 2016. The 2nd WFMD had 450 events in 63 countries. The WFMD communication campaign was developed under the slogan "Fish can't travel like we can" to highlight that fish are restricted to in-water movements that demand connectivity.  Results from social media, newspaper, TV and internet analysis show that WFMD 2016 had a global reach of over 70 million people.

WFMD 2018
The third World Fish Migration Day took place on April 21, 2018. Over 3000 organizations participated culminating in 570 events in 63 countries. It is estimated that over 200,000 people joined local events—the most participation yet. Highlights included the release of the new From Sea to Source 2.0 guidance book. This book was written by a team of international experts that impart their knowledge of river restoration activities and important migratory fish species.

External links
World Fish Migration Day
Fish Passage Conference

References 

May observances
Fish conservation
Animal migration
Environmental awareness days